The 1985 CONCACAF Championship was the ninth edition of the CONCACAF Championship. It also served as the qualification for the 1986 World Cup. A total of 18 CONCACAF teams entered the competition. The North, Central American and Caribbean zone was allocated 2 places (out of 24) in the final tournament. Mexico, the World Cup host, qualified automatically, leaving 1 spot open for competition between 17 teams. Canada earned their first major title and clinched qualification on 14 September 1985 to participate in their first World Cup after beating Honduras 2–1 at King George V Park in St. John's, Newfoundland.

Qualification

Final tournament

First round

Group 1

Honduras advanced to the Second Round.

Group 2

Canada advanced to the second round.

Group 3

Costa Rica advanced to the second round.

Final round

Canada qualified for the 1986 FIFA World Cup.

Qualified teams
The following team from CONCACAF qualified for the final tournament.

1 Bold indicates champions for that year. Italic indicates hosts for that year.

Goalscorers

5 goals

 José Roberto Figueroa

4 goals

 Dale Mitchell

3 goals

 Igor Vrablic
 Johnny Williams
 José María Rivas
 Porfirio Armando Betancourt

2 goals

 George Pakos
 Byron Pérez
 Eduardo Laing

1 goal

 Mike Sweeney
 Paul James
 Alexandre Guimarães
 Alvaro Solano
 Evaristo Coronado
 Miguel Lacey
 Milton Noriega
 Oscar Ramírez
 Jorge Manuel Ulate
 Baltazar Zapata
 Ever Hernández
 Mauricio Alfaro
 Wilfredo Huezo
 Eduardo Estrada Aquino
 Raul Galindo
 Julio Gómez Rendón
 Juan Manuel Funes
 Raúl Chacón
 Roberto Bailey
 Kenneth Stewart
 Rinaldo Entingh
 Necik De Noon
 Adrian Fonrose
 Chico Borja
 John Kerr, Jr.
 Mark Peterson
 Paul Caligiuri

See also
2000 CONCACAF Gold Cup

References

External links
 CONCACAF Championship 1985 on RSSSF Archive
 Canada – 1985 CONCACAF Champions

 
Championship
1985
1986 FIFA World Cup qualification
1985
1984–85 in Salvadoran football
1984–85 in Honduran football
1984–85 in Costa Rican football
1984–85 in Guatemalan football
1985–86 in Salvadoran football
1985–86 in Honduran football
1985–86 in Costa Rican football
1985–86 in Guatemalan football
1985 in Canadian soccer
1985 in American soccer